Events in the year 1911 in Bulgaria.

Incumbents 
Tsar Ferdinand I

Events 
Births:
Todor Zhivkov,future leader of Bulgaria when it fell under a communist coup in 1946.
 4 September – The People's Party-Progressive Liberal Party alliance won 190 of the 213 seats in the parliament following parliamentary elections. Voter turnout was 47.2%.

References 

 
1910s in Bulgaria
Years of the 20th century in Bulgaria
Bulgaria
Bulgaria